Polideportivo El Plantío is a multi-purpose sports arena in Burgos, Castile and León, Spain. It has a capacity of 2,432 seats but for CB Miraflores games it's expanded to 3,150 by adding chairs in all the corridors.

It is owned by the Burgos City Hall. The arena serves as the home of the main local sports teams.

El Plantío has also rooms for practicing fencing, boxing and table tennis. The most important event at El Plantío was the U23 World Basketball Championship in July 1993.

References

External links
 El Plantío at Burgos City Hall website
 CV Diego Porcelos website

Indoor arenas in Spain
Basketball venues in Spain
Sports venues in Castile and León
Boxing venues in Spain
Buildings and structures in Burgos
Sport in Burgos
Sports venues completed in 1979
1979 establishments in Spain